Jeremy Fisher is a Canadian singer-songwriter.

Jeremy Fisher may also refer to:

Jeremy Fisher (author) (born 1954), New Zealand author active in Australia
Jeremy David Fisher (born 1974), American video producer
Jeremy Fisher, a character in Salad Fingers, a flash cartoon series by David Firth
Jeremy Fisher, a character in The Tale of Mr. Jeremy Fisher, a 1906 book by Beatrix Potter

See also
Jeremy Fischer (disambiguation)